SV Schwarz-Rot Neustadt is a German football club based in Neustadt (Dosse), Brandenburg, currently playing in the Landesliga Brandenburg-Nord (VII).

History 
The forerunner of SV Schwarz-Rot Neustadt was founded in July 1922 as Köritzer Sport-Club. KSC became BSG Landbau Neustadt in 1978 and the final renaming to SV Schwarz-Rot was announced on 27 July 1990. The club competed in the 1993–94 NOFV-Oberliga as a third-tier side, taking 11th place in the NOFV-Oberliga Nord which preceded 13th and 14th placed finishes the following two seasons. The club made a further cameo appearance in the 2000–01 NOFV-Oberliga, but were relegated back to the Verbandsliga Brandenburg after finishing second from bottom. In 2008 the Verbandsliga became a sixth-tier league and a year later Schwarz-Rot were relegated again, this time to seventh-tier Landesliga where they played until 2015 when they were promoted to the Brandenburg-Liga again.

Honours 
The club's honours:
 Brandenburg-Liga
 Champions: 1993, 2000

Stadium 
SV Schwarz-Rot Neustadt plays its home fixtures at the 1,100 capacity Hans-Beimler-Stadion.

References

External links 
 SV Schwarz-Rot Neustadt 

Football clubs in Germany
Football clubs in Brandenburg
Association football clubs established in 1990
1990 establishments in Germany